The invertebrate mitochondrial code (translation table 5) is a genetic code used by the mitochondrial genome of invertebrates.

The code
   AAs  = FFLLSSSSYY**CCWWLLLLPPPPHHQQRRRRIIMMTTTTNNKKSSSSVVVVAAAADDEEGGGG
Starts = ---M----------------------------MMMM---------------M------------
 Base1 = TTTTTTTTTTTTTTTTCCCCCCCCCCCCCCCCAAAAAAAAAAAAAAAAGGGGGGGGGGGGGGGG
 Base2 = TTTTCCCCAAAAGGGGTTTTCCCCAAAAGGGGTTTTCCCCAAAAGGGGTTTTCCCCAAAAGGGG
 Base3 = TCAGTCAGTCAGTCAGTCAGTCAGTCAGTCAGTCAGTCAGTCAGTCAGTCAGTCAGTCAGTCAG

Bases: adenine (A), cytosine (C), guanine (G) and thymine (T) or uracil (U).

Amino acids: Alanine (Ala, A), Arginine (Arg, R), Asparagine (Asn, N), Aspartic acid (Asp, D), Cysteine (Cys, C), Glutamic acid (Glu, E), Glutamine (Gln, Q), Glycine (Gly, G), Histidine (His, H), Isoleucine (Ile, I), Leucine (Leu, L), Lysine (Lys, K), Methionine (Met, M), Phenylalanine (Phe, F), Proline (Pro, P), Serine (Ser, S), Threonine (Thr, T), Tryptophan (Trp, W), Tyrosine (Tyr, Y), Valine (Val, V).

Differences from the standard code

Note: The codon AGG is absent in Drosophila.

Alternative initiation codons

 AUA, AUU
 AUC: Apis 
 GUG: Polyplacophora
 UUG: Ascaris, Caenorhabditis.

Systematic range
 Nematoda: Ascaris, Caenorhabditis ;
 Mollusca: Bivalvia); Polyplacophora;
 Arthropoda/Crustacea: Artemia;
 Arthropoda/Insecta: Drosophila [Locusta migratoria (migratory locust), Apis mellifera (honeybee)].

Other variations
 Several arthropods translate the codon AGG as lysine instead of serine (as in the Pterobranchia Mitochondrial Code) or arginine (as in the standard genetic code).
 GUG may possibly function as an initiator in Drosophila. AUU is not used as an initiator in Mytilus
 "An exceptional mechanism must operate for initiation of translation of the cytochrome oxidase subunit I mRNA in both D. melanogaster and D. yakuba, since its only plausible initiation codon, AUA, is out of frame with the rest of the gene. Initiation appears to require the "reading" of an AUAA quadruplet, which would be equivalent to initiation at AUA followed immediately by a specific ribosomal frameshift. Another possible mechanism ... is that the mRNA is "edited" to bring the AUA initiation into frame."

See also 
 List of genetic codes

References 

Molecular genetics
Gene expression
Protein biosynthesis